Blind Detective is a 2013 Hong Kong-Chinese action crime romantic comedy film directed by Johnnie To and starring Andy Lau and Sammi Cheng.

The film was shown as part of the Shanghai International Film Festival.

Plot
Forced to leave service after turning blind, former detective Johnston Chong See-tun (Andy Lau) ekes out his living by solving cold cases for police rewards. During a case involving the search for the culprit who throws acid off roofs, he meets an attractive hit team inspector Goldie Ho Ka-tung (Sammi Cheng). When Ho notices Johnston's impressive investigative mind despite lack of vision, she enlists his help in a personal case she is unable to solve on her own. The two work together to solve the case as well as other cold cases.

Cast
Andy Lau as Johnston Chong See-tun (莊士敦), blind detective, a former inspector of the Regional Crime Unit known as "The God of Cracking Cases"
Sammi Cheng as Goldie Ho Ka-tung (何家彤), a police inspector
Guo Tao as Szeto Fat-bo (司徒法寶), chief inspector of the Organised Crime & Triad Bureau (OCTB)
Gao Yuanyuan as Tingting (丁丁), a dance instructor who is Johnston's dream lover.
Zi Yi as Joe (祖), Goldie's old neighbor
Lang Yueting as Minnie Lee (李小敏), Goldie's childhood friend that have gone missing during their teenage years
Cheng Ho-lam as Teenage Minnie
Lam Suet as Lee Tak-shing (李得勝)
Philip Keung as Chan Kwong (陳廣)
Chung Wong as Fat Guy (肥漢)
Lo Hoi-pang as Pang (鵬)
Bonnie Wong as Minnie's grandmother
Stephanie Che as Pang's daughter
Mimi Chu as Pang's wife
Eileen Yeow as Pang's daughter-in-law
Li Shing-cheong as Pang's son
Raymond Tsang as Pang's son-in-law
Hedi He as Joe's partner
Yan Ni as Joe's partner's wife

Production
Filming of Blind Detective began in the second half of 2011 in Hong Kong. In June 2012, filming halted after Sammi Cheng was diagnosed with Ménière's disease before resuming filming in August 2012.  The film held a worship ceremony on 3 September 2012. The music in the film was provided by Canadian television music composer Hal Foxton Beckett.

Release
The film was selected to play as part of the Midnight selection at the 2013 Cannes Film Festival, while it was theatrically released on 4 July 2013 in Hong Kong and China.

Reception
Derek Elley of Film Business Asia gave the film a score of two out of ten, noting a poor script and describing it as "A rare example of a Johnnie To movie in which nothing seems to work, and even at a basic craft level is below the prolific Hong Kong director's usual standards." Neil Young The Hollywood Reporter also gave the film a negative review, calling it a "punishingly overlong, overcooked confection. Stir in frequent helpings of larkish blind-man slapstick and what results is a misshapen and unsatisfying stew of different genres." Lee Marshall of Screen Daily also gave the film a negative review, stating that "Blind Detective is a decidedly minor offering from the director of The Mission and last year’s impressive mainland-set Drug Wars."

Andrew Chan of the Film Critics Circle of Australia wrote, "As a love story, it works, but the film falls flat on the ground with a padded up detective story that will take more than a gallon of gold to convince."

Awards and nominations

See also
Andy Lau filmography
Johnnie To filmography

References

External links
 

Hong Kong crime thriller films
Hong Kong romantic comedy films
2013 films
2013 crime thriller films
2013 romantic comedy films
Police detective films
2010s Cantonese-language films
Media Asia films
Milkyway Image films
Films directed by Johnnie To
Films about blind people
Films set in Hong Kong
Films shot in Hong Kong
Films with screenplays by Yau Nai-hoi
Films with screenplays by Wai Ka-fai
2010s Hong Kong films